The 2019–20 Segona Divisió, also known as Lliga UNIDA, was the 21st season of second-tier football in Andorra. The season began on 21 September 2019 and ended on 11 July 2020.

On 5 May, the clubs and the federation agreed on how to finish the season. The two teams which remained mathematically able to qualify for promotion played each other twice to determine final places in the league. On 1 July, this was confirmed.

Teams
At the end of the previous season, Atlètic Club d'Escaldes and Carroi were promoted to the Primera Divisió. These two teams were replaced in the Segona Divisió by Lusitanos and Encamp who were relegated from the Primera Divisió.

League table

Results

Primera Divisió play-offs

See also
 2019–20 Primera Divisió
 2020 Copa Constitució

References

External links
 FAF

Segona Divisió seasons
Andorra
Segona Divisio